Hexosaminidase A (alpha polypeptide), also known as HEXA, is an enzyme that in humans is encoded by the HEXA gene, located on the 15th chromosome.

Hexosaminidase A and the cofactor GM2 activator protein catalyze the degradation of the GM2 gangliosides and other molecules containing terminal N-acetyl hexosamines.   Hexosaminidase A is a heterodimer composed of an alpha subunit (this protein) and a beta subunit.  The alpha subunit polypeptide is encoded by the HEXA gene while the beta subunit is encoded by the HEXB gene.  Gene mutations in the gene encoding the beta subunit (HEXB) often result in Sandhoff disease; whereas, mutations in the gene encoding the alpha subunit (HEXA, this gene) decrease the hydrolysis of GM2 gangliosides, which is the main cause of Tay–Sachs disease.

Function 

Even though the alpha and beta subunits of hexosaminidase A can both cleave GalNAc residues, only the alpha subunit is able to hydrolyze GM2 gangliosides. The alpha subunit contains a key residue, Arg-424, which is essential for binding the N-acetyl-neuramanic residue of GM2 gangliosides.   The alpha subunit can hydrolyze GM2 gangliosides because it contains a loop structure consisting of the amino acids: Gly-280, Ser-281, Glu-282, and Pro-283.  The loop is absent in the beta subunit, but it serves as an ideal structure for the binding of the GM2 activator protein (GM2AP) in the alpha subunit.  A combination of Arg-424 and the amino acids that cause the formation of the loop allow the alpha subunit to hydrolyze GM2 gangliosides into GM3 gangliosides by removing the N-acetylgalactosamine (GalNAc) residue from GM2 gangliosides.

Gene mutations resulting in Tay–Sachs disease 

There are numerous mutations that lead to hexosaminidase A deficiency including gene deletions, nonsense mutations, and missense mutations.  Tay–Sachs disease occurs when hexosaminidase A loses its ability to function. People with Tay–Sachs disease are unable to remove the GalNAc residue from the GM2 ganglioside, and as a result, they end up storing 100 to 1000 times more  GM2 gangliosides in the brain than the normal person.  Over 100 different mutations have been discovered just in infantile cases of Tay–Sachs disease alone.

The most common mutation, which occurs in over 80 percent of Tay–Sachs patients, results from a four base pair addition (TATC) in exon 11 of the Hex A gene. This insertion leads to an early stop codon, which causes the Hex A deficiency.

Children born with Tay–Sachs usually die between two and six years of age from aspiration and pneumonia. Tay–Sachs causes cerebral degeneration and blindness. Patients also experience flaccid extremities and seizures. There is no cure for Tay–Sachs disease.

Gene Therapies for Tay-Sachs 
The HEXA gene is a protein encoding gene that codes for the lysosomal enzyme beta-hexosaminidase. This enzyme, combined with the GM2 activator protein, is responsible for the breakdown of ganglioside GM2 within the lysosome. Defects in the HEXA gene, however, prevent this degradation, leading to a buildup of toxins in brain and spinal cord cells. This fatal genetic disorder is called Tay-Sachs disease. Because the Tay-Sachs gene defect mainly affects neural cells, a patient with the HEXA mutation will experience a quick deterioration of motor and mental function before dying around the age of three or four. [8]

A “knockout” model, which is a mouse that has been genetically modified to observe the effects of inactivation of or damage to certain genes, found that the mice that were administered the HEXA gene experienced many of the same symptoms of Tay-Sachs, with one exception: GM2 buildup was distributed differently in the brains of the mice than in those of a typical human Tay-Sachs patient. [9] This model has allowed scientists to research gene therapies for HEXA defects. One study, done on mice, successfully reestablished beta-hexoaminidase levels and removed the toxic cell buildup by using a non-replicated Herpes simplex vector to code for the missing gene. [10]

References

Further reading

External links 

 
 
 National Tay-Sach’s Disease Site

Genes on human chromosome 15